Berlin (officially renamed Ntabozuko on 23 February 2021) is a small town in the Buffalo City Metropolitan Municipality in the Eastern Cape province of South Africa.

Located about 20 km east of Qonce, it was founded in 1857 by Carl Pape, a missionary, and German settlers of the British-German Legion, and named after the German metropolis of Berlin.

References

Populated places in Buffalo City Metropolitan Municipality
German settlements in South Africa
1857 establishments in the Cape Colony